Äkkiä Anttolassa is a Finnish television series. It first aired on Finnish TV in 1999 and last aired in 2000.

Cast
Eero Aho
Kari Hietalahti
Aake Kalliala

See also
List of Finnish television series

External links
 

Finnish television shows
1999 Finnish television series debuts
2000 Finnish television series endings
1990s Finnish television series
2000s Finnish television series
Yle original programming